Hetan is a rural town in Xinhuang Dong Autonomous County, Hunan, China. It borders Huangzhou Town in the north, Butouxiang Miao Ethnic Township in the east, Zhongzhai Town in the southeast, and Fuluo Town in the west and southwest.

History
In October 2015, some places of former Dongping Township and former Lishu Township merged into Hetan Township to form Hetan Town.

Geography

The Fuluo River winds through the town.

Transportation
The Provincial Highway S232 passes across the town north to south.

References

Xinhuang